Tokuhime may refer to:

 Tokuhime (Oda) (徳姫) (1559–1636), daughter of Oda Nobunaga; also known as Gotokuhime
 Tokuhime (Tokugawa) (督姫) (1565–1615), daughter of Tokugawa Ieyasu
  (登久姫) (1576–1607), daughter of Matsudaira Nobuyasu and Tokuhime (Oda)